The  is a line of the Japanese Shinkansen high-speed rail network, connecting Shin-Osaka in Osaka with Hakata Station in Fukuoka, the two largest cities in western Japan. Operated by the West Japan Railway Company (JR West), it is a westward continuation of the Tōkaidō Shinkansen and also serves other major cities in between on Honshu and Kyushu islands such as Kobe, Himeji, Okayama, Hiroshima, and Kitakyushu. The Kyushu Shinkansen continues south of Hakata to Kagoshima.

Rolling stock
As of March 2020, the following types are used on San'yō Shinkansen services.
 500 series: Kodama services
 700–7000 series: Hikari / Kodama services
 N700 series: Nozomi / Hikari / Kodama services
 N700-7000/8000 series: Mizuho / Sakura / Kodama services

Former rolling stock
 0 series: Hikari / Kodama services
 100 series: Hikari / Kodama services
 300 series: Nozomi / Hikari / Kodama services
 700-0 series: Nozomi / Hikari / Kodama services
 700–3000 series: Nozomi / Hikari / Kodama services

Stations 

All stations on the San'yō Shinkansen are owned and operated by JR West, with the exception of Shin-Osaka which is run by Central Japan Railway Company (JR central). Kodama trains stop at all stations; other services have varying stopping patterns. All trains stop at Shin-Osaka, Shin-Kobe, Okayama, Hiroshima, Kokura, and Hakata. The Japan Rail Pass is not valid for travel on the Nozomi or Mizuho trains.

Legend:

History 

Construction of the San'yō Shinkansen between Shin-Ōsaka and Okayama was authorized on 9 September 1965, and commenced on March 16, 1967. Construction between Okayama and Hakata commenced on 10 February 1970. The Shin-Ōsaka to Okayama segment opened on March 15, 1972; the remainder of the line opened on March 10, 1975. The first Hikari trains, using 0 series trains, made the Shin-Ōsaka to Hakata run in 3 hours 44 minutes.

Tokyo to Hakata Nozomi services began on 18 March 1993, using 300 series trains.

The 700 series was introduced on Tokyo-Hakata Nozomi services on 13 March 1999, coinciding with the opening of Asa Station, and on 11 March 2000, 700 series trains were introduced on Hikari Rail Star services.

Ogori Station was renamed Shin-Yamaguchi Station on 1 October 2003.

From the start of the revised timetable on 12 March 2011, new Mizuho and Sakura inter-running services commenced between Shin-Ōsaka and Kagoshima on the Kyushu Shinkansen using new N700-7000 and N700-8000 series 8-car trainsets. This boosted JR West's market share in the Osaka-Kagoshima passenger market from 13% in March 2011 to 35% in March 2012. JR West began offering discounted advance purchase fares on this route in July 2013 in an effort to compete for market share with new low-cost airlines such as Peach. With the launch of Mizuho and Sakura services, nearly all of the Hikari services operating solely on the San'yō Shinkansen (mostly Rail Star services) were discontinued as it was deemed redundant.

Ridership 
In fiscal 2005, the Sanyo Shinkansen line ridership was 58 million passengers/year, or about 159,000 daily.

References

External links

 JR West website 

Lines of West Japan Railway Company
High-speed railway lines in Japan
Railway lines opened in 1972
Standard gauge railways in Japan
1972 establishments in Japan